Stefan Leković (born 9 January 2004) is a Serbian footballer who plays as a centre-back for Red Star Belgrade.

References

External links
 
 
 

 

2004 births
Living people
Association football defenders
Serbian footballers
Serbian First League players
Red Star Belgrade footballers
RFK Grafičar Beograd players
People from Belgrade
Serbia youth international footballers